Amritpal Singh may refer to:

Amritpal Singh (basketball) (born 1991), Indian basketball player
Amritpal Singh (footballer) (born 2001) professional footballer who plays as a defender
Amritpal Singh (long jumper) (born 1983), Indian track and field athlete
Amritpal Singh Dhillon (born 1993), Canadian singer and rapper
Amritpal Singh (activist) (born 1993), Indian Sikh leader of Waris Panjab De
Amritpal Singh Sukhanand, Indian politician